Mercure may refer to:

 MERCURE, an atmospheric dispersion modelling CFD code developed by Électricité de France
 Mercure Hotels, a chain of hotels run by Accor
 French ship Mercure (1783)
 Dassault Mercure, a French airliner built in the 1970s
 HMS Mercure (1798), a French privateer captured and put into service by the British
 Mercure (ballet), of 1924 with music by Erik Satie
 Mercure (Nothomb), a novel by Belgian writer Amélie Nothomb first published in 1998
 R v Mercure, a decision of the Supreme Court of Canada
 Mercure de France,  a French gazette and literary magazine first published in the 17th century

See also
 Mercur (disambiguation)
 Mercury (disambiguation)
 Merkur (disambiguation)